David Doherty may refer to:

 David Doherty (politician), New Hampshire politician
 David Doherty (rugby union) (born 1987), English rugby union player
 David H. Doherty, Canadian judge

See also 
 David O'Doherty (born 1975), Irish comedian
 David Docherty,  British writer, journalist and television executive
 David Dougherty (1967–2017), New Zealander falsely convicted of abduction and rape
 Doherty (surname)